YWCA Blue Triangle Residence Hall is a historic YWCA residence hall located at Indianapolis, Indiana.  It was designed by the architecture firm Rubush & Hunter and built in 1924. It is a five-story, "L"-plan, Classical Revival style steel frame building clad in red brick.  It has a raised brick faced foundation and central entrance with a carved limestone surround.

It was listed on the National Register of Historic Places in 1988.

References

External links

YWCA buildings
Residential buildings on the National Register of Historic Places in Indiana
Neoclassical architecture in Indiana
Residential buildings completed in 1924
Buildings and structures in Indianapolis
National Register of Historic Places in Indianapolis
History of women in Indiana